İşbank, officially Türkiye İş Bankası, is a commercial bank in Turkey. It was the largest private bank in the country by the size of total assets, total loans, total deposits and equity, as well as by the number of branches and employees as of 31 December 2021.[5] It was the first bank founded by the Turkish Republic.[6] İşbank is a bank that provides consumer loans, vehicle loans, housing loans and commercial loans.[7] “İşbank has the 181st place in The Banker Top 1000 World Banks Ranking 2021”.[8] It was ranked and 673 on the Forbes Global 2000 list for 2021.[9] It had a net profit for 2021 of TRY 13.5 billion[10] and TRY 90.2 billion (equivalent to US$6.9 billion) in Tier I Capital, as defined by Basel's Bank for International Settlements.

The bank operates 1,174 branches domestically, giving it one of the largest branch networks in Turkey. İşbank's international network comprises 14 branches in the Turkish Republic of Northern Cyprus, two branches in each of Iraq, Kosovo and the United Kingdom,[11], one branch each in Bahrain and one representative office in each of Cairo and Shanghai. İşbank's German banking subsidiary (İşbank GmbH) has 9 branches in Germany and one branch in the Netherlands. İşbank's Russian banking subsidiary (JSC İşbank) has one branch and two representative offices in Russia. There is also a subsidiary in Georgia (JSC İşbank Georgia) with branches in Tbilisi and Batumi.

History 

Following the culmination of World War I in 1918 and the subsequent dissolution of the Ottoman Empire in 1922, Turkey was declared a republic and Mustafa Kemal Atatürk was elected by parliament as the first president of Turkey. Atatürk was quick to realise that the government needed a national bank to rebuild Turkey's economy following the debacle of the war. İşbank, the first truly national bank in the Turkish Republic was founded on 26 August 1924 at the First Economy Congress in İzmir.

Atatürk appointed Celâl Bayar, his close aide and then the Minister of Exchange Construction and Settlement as the president of the newly formed bank. İşbank began operations with two branches and 37 staff under the leadership of Celâl Bayar, its first general manager. The bank was established with a capital of 1 TL Million of which 250'000 TL was covered by Atatürk, and the rest by private investors.[12] In 1927 the capital was raised by 2 Million TL so it could be merged with the National Credit Bank as equal partners.[13]

Contributions to banking in Turkey 
 The use of cheques for daily transactions.
 Initiating electronic banking in the country.
 Introduction of the ATM.
 Overseas branches in Europe and Turkish Republic of Northern Cyprus.
 Saving accounts.
 Mutual funds.
 Introduction of child's coin bank.
 Operation of an in-house securities division.
 Interactive banking service since July 1996
 Deployment of Netmatik machines, to enable online banking among clients without access to a computer.
 Introduction of mobile banking on WAP enabled GSM phones.
 Bankamatik(+) which allows the money to be put directly to the account of the client.
 Introduction of Maximum Cash Point which allows clients to draw cash from POS machine where there is no ATM available.

Financial operations 

In May 1998, 12.3% of the Bank's total shares previously held by the Turkish Treasury have been sold to national and international investors in a public offering. The states Pension Fund has brokered the offering of stock options to employees and retired staff in the company which has reached 41.5%. As of December 2021, 37.3% of Isbank shares are held by Isbank's own Pension Fund, 28.1% are represented by Republican People's Party (CHP) and 34.6% are free float.[14] In February 2019 the Turkish President Recep Tayyip Erdoğan announced that he advocated of transferring the shares held by the CHP to the treasury.[14]

Işbank’s shares are listed on Borsa Istanbul and its depository receipts are traded on London Stock Exchange as GDR (REG S). As of Decemder 2021, İşbank's market value was TRY 34.1 billion.[14]

See also

List of companies of Turkey
List of banks in Turkey

References

Sources
 

Banks of Turkey
Companies listed on the Istanbul Stock Exchange
Banks established in 1924
Companies based in Istanbul
Turkish brands
Turkish companies established in 1924